The first season of the Showcase television series Continuum premiered on May 27, 2012 and concluded on August 5, 2012. The series is created by Simon Barry. The series centers on Kiera Cameron (Rachel Nichols) as she time travels from 2077 to 2012 with a group of terrorists, and attempts to find a way home.  All the episode titles in this season use the word "Time."

Cast

Main
 Rachel Nichols as CPS "Protector"/Special Agent Kiera Cameron
 Victor Webster as Detective Carlos Fonnegra
 Erik Knudsen as a young Alec Sadler
 Stephen Lobo as Matthew Kellog
 Tony Amendola as Edouard Kagame
 Roger Cross as Travis Verta
 Lexa Doig as Sonya Valentine
 Omari Newton as Lucas Ingram
 Luvia Petersen as Jasmine Garza
 Jennifer Spence as Detective Betty Robertson
 Brian Markinson as Inspector Dillon

Recurring
 William B. Davis as an elderly Alec Sadler
 Janet Kidder as Ann Sadler
 Michael Rogers as Roland Randol
 Richard Harmon as Julian Randol
 Gerry Nairn as an elderly Julian Randol/Theseus
 John Reardon as Greg Cameron
 Sean Michael Kyer as Sam Cameron
 Terry Chen as Curtis Chen
 Mike Dopud as Stefan Jaworski
 Jonathan Walker as Martin Bradley
 Beatrice Sallis as Edouard Kagame's mother
 Tahmoh Penikett as Jim Martin

Episodes

DVD release

References

External links
 
 

2012 Canadian television seasons
1